Hard Lines was an iOS game by British developer Spilt Milk Studios Ltd, released on June 9, 2011. It is a re-interpretation of the classic Snake mobile game. It has six distinct modes, including Survival, Gauntlet, and Time Attack. It challenges our reflexes and prior-planning chops, while a collision detection system assuages any touchscreen interface fears.

Reception
The game was a Metacritic score of 86% based on 11 critic reviews.

AppSmile wrote "A blast of nostalgia from days gone by, Hard Lines improves upon the winning formula by offering multiple game modes, multiple input methods, and a rocking soundtrack to boot."

AppSpy said "Hard Lines doesn't require fancy 3D graphics or a huge gimmick to make Snake fun again; amusing writing, multiple modes and competitive AI go a long way to revive this classic game."

Slidetoplay argued "You will believe...that lines have feelings, too."

148apps said "Hard Lines is a little gem simply put. It's immensely enjoyable offering that 'just one more go' mentality. With its keen sense of humor (right down to the credits song which is very much worth listening to), Hard Lines keeps one step ahead of the pack making it an essential purchase."

TouchArcade wrote "Don't write this off as just another knockoff. Hard Lines takes the formula further with six great game modes. Yes, you can play Snake mode, where your line grows ever longer as you gobble up glowy things. "

Multiplayer.it wrote "Hard Lines is an amazing attempt to revive an old gameplay with a formula that mixes two different gameplay mechanics. That's not just a Snake clone: it's a game about surviving that charms the player with chiptune music and neon graphics."

Edge magazine wrote "It gets far more laughs than it should, and special mention to its credits song: perhaps the finest ending on the App Store. Original, funny, and intense: for a game based on Snake, not bad at all."

Eurogamer said "Like most things in life, personality goes a long way, and Hard Lines has it in spades. And probably buckets as well."

Pocketgamer said "A gloriously inventive combination of Nokia's Snake and Tron's light cycles, Hard Lines includes a dazzling variety of modes and provides weeks of entertainment for short-burst gamers and dedicated score-chasers alike."

Gamezebo wrote "In taking a classic concept and packing it to the brim with personality and playability, Spilt Milk Studios has developed an absolute winner through and through. If you've ever enjoyed Snake, TRON, or talking lines, make this one your next purchase."

NZ gamer said "It's not the most amazing thing ever by any stretch of the imagination but if you like the idea of a suped-up Snake, with a bunch of modes, and don't want to lower yourself to lugging a dated mobile phone around with you, it's hard to beat."

Pixelated Sausage said "Hard Lines is basically Snake with a lot of deviations and the presence of personality. It may be my love of Snake, but Hard Lines is one of the best iPhone games I've played in quite some time."

Now

At the end of 2019, is not possible to find game in Apple App Store for IOS, only is present in Google Play for Android.

References

External links

2011 video games
Android (operating system) games
IOS games
Maze games
Video games developed in the United Kingdom